Harry Anthony Compton Pelissier (27 July 1912 – 2 April 1988) was an English actor, screenwriter, producer and director.

Biography
Pelissier was born in Barnet and came from a theatrical family. His parents were the theatre producer H. G. Pelissier (who presented Pelissier's Follies) and the actress Fay Compton. His uncle was Compton MacKenzie, who wrote Whisky Galore.

Pelissier began acting in the 1930s. In 1935 and 1936, he was featured in Noël Coward's play cycle, Tonight at 8.30, both in Britain and on Broadway. He also played in Coward's Set to Music (1939) He began writing in 1937 and directing in 1949. He was the screenwriter and director of four popular films: The History of Mr Polly (1949), The Rocking Horse Winner (1950), Night Without Stars (1951), and Personal Affair starring Gene Tierney written by Lesley Storm. He also directed Encore (1951). He also directed Ealing's satire on television Meet Mr Lucifer (1953). He later headed the experimental production unit at the BBC.

Personal life
Pelissier was married four times
 Penelope Dudley-Ward (m. 29 December 1939  – divorced 1944); the couple had one daughter, actress Tracy Reed (1942–2012)
 Margaret A Hyde (m. 1945), with whom he produced two daughters, Harriet (b. 1945) and Marie-Louise (b. 1949)
 Actress Monica Grey (m. in France) with whom he had one son, Joe Pelissier (b. 1963)
 Actress Ursula Howells (m. 1968 – 2 April 1988)

Death
Pelissier died in  Eastbourne, England, on 2 April 1988, aged 75. He was survived by his wife, Ursula Howells, and his four children.

Selected filmography
 Perfect Strangers (1945) (writer)
 The History of Mr Polly (1949) (writer and director)
 The Rocking Horse Winner (1950) (writer and director)
 Night Without Stars (1951) (writer and director)
 Encore (1951) (director)
 Personal Affair (1953) (director, credited as Anthony Pélissier)
 The Man who Stroked Cats (1955) (Directed, and co-wrote, with Morley Roberts) (with Tony Britton and Peggy Anne Clifford)

References

External links

1912 births
1988 deaths
English film directors
English film producers
People from Chipping Barnet
20th-century English male actors
20th-century English businesspeople